Aoshima (written: 青島 or 青嶋 lit. "blue island") is a Japanese surname. Notable people with the surname include:

 (born 1974), Japanese artist
 (born 1968), Japanese footballer
 Mirai Aoshima, professional shogi player
 (1932–2006), Japanese politician

Fictional characters:
Aoshima Toshiyuki, character from the manga series Oh My Goddess!

Japanese-language surnames